The Bernt Gustad House is a historic one-and-a-half-story house in Volin, South Dakota. It was built in 1906 as a cottage with a dormer, and designed in the Queen Anne architectural style. It has been listed on the National Register of Historic Places since April 16, 1980.

References

National Register of Historic Places in Yankton County, South Dakota
Houses completed in 1906
1906 establishments in South Dakota